Pennsylvania State University College of Medicine (PSCOM), known simply as Penn State College of Medicine is the medical school of Pennsylvania State University, a public university system in Pennsylvania. It is located in Hershey near the Penn State Milton S. Hershey Medical Center and Penn State Children's Hospital, the medical school's principal affiliate. The medical school includes 26 basic science and clinical departments and a broad range of clinical programs conducted at its hospital affiliates and numerous ambulatory care sites in the region.

History 
In 1963, the M. S. Hershey Foundation offered $50 million to the Pennsylvania State University to establish a medical school and teaching hospital in Hershey, Pennsylvania.

Penn State Health 
Penn State Health was formed in 2014 to consolidate health care providers in the area. In 2015, it acquired St. Joseph Regional Health Network in Berks County from Catholic Health Initiatives.

Statistics 
, the Penn State College of Medicine has graduated 3,907 physicians (M.D.) and 1,004 scientists with Ph.D. or M.S. degrees.  The College of Medicine offers degree programs in anatomy, bioengineering, biomedical sciences, bioinformatics and genomics, genetics, immunology and infectious diseases, integrative biosciences, molecular medicine, molecular toxicology, neuroscience, pharmacology, and physiology. Two postdoctoral programs leading to an M.S. degree are offered, namely in Laboratory Animal Medicine, the only such program in Pennsylvania, and Public Health Sciences.  Each year, more than 550 resident physicians are trained in medical specialties at the center. Penn State College of Medicine is Unranked in Best Medical Schools: Research and Unranked in Best Medical Schools: Primary Care by U.S. News & World Report.

LionCare student-run free clinic 
Since 2001, the students of the College of Medicine have operated a free clinic for the underserved of Central Pennsylvania. The clinic is called LionCare and is based out of the Bethesda Mission, a homeless shelter, in midtown Harrisburg, PA. It has specialized has clinics for Women's Health, Orthopedics, Neurology, Psychiatry and Dermatology.  The clinic is staffed and serviced  by the students of the college, under the supervision of faculty physicians.

References

External links
 

Pennsylvania State University colleges
1967 establishments in Pennsylvania
Medical schools in Pennsylvania
Educational institutions established in 1967